Hempstead Washburne (November 11, 1851April 13, 1918) was a Republican attorney and politician from Illinois who served as Mayor of Chicago from 1891 to 1893.  He was the son of United States Secretary of State Elihu B. Washburne.

Biography
Hempstead Washburne was born in Galena, Illinois on November 11, 1851, and attended Maine's Kents Hill School.  He studied at the University of Bonn in Germany, and graduated from the University of Wisconsin Law School in 1874.  In 1875, he completed supplemental legal education at Union College of Law (now Northwestern University Pritzker School of Law).

Washburne practiced law in Chicago. In 1880 he was appointed master in chancery for the Superior Court of Cook County. In 1885 he was elected Chicago city attorney. He was reelected in 1887, but declined to run again in 1889.

In 1891, Washubrne was elected as mayor of Chicago, defeating Democratic incumbent DeWitt Cregier in a four-way race which also included former mayor Carter Harrison Sr. (running as an independent Democrat) and Washburne's own cousin once-removed Elmer Washburn. Washburne was sworn in as mayor on April 27, 1891. As mayor, he presided over development of the World's Columbian Exposition. He did not seek reelection 1893, and was succeeded as mayor by Democrat Carter Harrison Sr. on April 17, 1893.

After leaving the mayor's office, Washburne resumed practicing law, and became active in several business ventures.  He also stayed active in government by serving on Chicago's civil service commission.  He suffered a stroke and died in Chicago on April 13, 1918.  He was buried at Graceland Cemetery.

Family

In 1883, Washburne married to Annie M. Clarke (1856-1939), a stage actress and the daughter of a prominent Chicago banker; they were the parents of four children.<ref>Pictorial History of the American Theatre: 1860-1985 pgs. 22 & 32, c.1985 by Daniel C. Blum</ref> Annie M. Clarke (New York Public Library, Billy Rose Collection) Retrieved June 22, 2017

References

External links

 Hempstead Washburne Biography at Chicago Public Library''

1852 births
1919 deaths
Burials at Graceland Cemetery (Chicago)
Mayors of Chicago
Washburn family
Illinois Republicans
19th-century American politicians
Kents Hill School alumni
University of Wisconsin Law School alumni
Northwestern University Pritzker School of Law alumni